Águas Claras is an administrative region in the Federal District in Brazil.

Etymology 
The region's name, Portuguese for clear waters, references to the stream within the region which flows into Paranoá Lake.

History 
In December 1992, District Law No. 385 authorized the implementation of Águas Claras, then part of Taguatinga; its occupation plan was approved later that same year. Designed by architect and urbanist Paulo Zimbres, Águas Claras began construction shortly afterwards. It was separated from Taguatinga as the Federal District's twentieth administrative region on May 6 2003, through District Law No. 3153.

The neighborhood was notable for its accelerated growth, with large and diversified real estate developments.

Águas Claras has an area of approximately 31.5 km²  and a population of just over 135 thousand.

See also
List of administrative regions of the Federal District

References

External links

 Regional Administration of Águas Claras website
 Government of the Federal District website

Administrative regions of Federal District (Brazil)
2003 establishments in Brazil
Populated places established in 2003